Seldon Connor (January 25, 1839July 9, 1917) was an American soldier, banker, and politician who was the 35th Governor of the U.S. state of Maine.

Biography
Seldon Conner  was born in Fairfield, Maine, and in 1859 graduated at Tufts College, as well as studying law in Vermont. While attending Tufts University, he was a member of the Zeta Psi Fraternity.

Following the outbreak of the American Civil War, Connor entered the military service in May 1861 as a private in the 1st Vermont Infantry, but became ill with chronic catarrh, recovering the following winter. In August 1861 was commissioned as lieutenant colonel of the 7th Maine Infantry. Seldon became Colonel of the 19th Maine Infantry in January 1864, and was severely wounded in the Battle of the Wilderness. He was promoted to the rank of brigadier general of Volunteers on June 11, 1864. General Seldon was incapacitated from active field service due to his injuries and was mustered out in 1866.

After the war, Connor began involvement in political issues in 1868, becoming an assessor of the Internal Revenue, as well as serving as the regional collector of internal revenue in 1874. In 1875, he was elected governor of Maine as a Republican. He appointed James G. Blaine to the vacant Senate seat.  During his time in politics, Connor advocated civil service reform, and supported the resumption of specie payments. Connor was also responsible for promoting a free public school system, in which he was successful. Connor resigned from office on January 8, 1879, after failing to win reelection.

Subsequently, he was United States pension agent from 1882 to 1886. Connor was active in veterans affairs, and in 1890 became president of the Society of the Army of the Potomac. From 1896 to 1899, he was the senior vice-commander-in-chief of the Military Order of the Loyal Legion of the United States. In 1897, he was again appointed as a pension agent. His address on Hannibal Hamlin was published in 1909. Connor remained a prominent figure in Maine politics, and also served as president of the Northern Banking Company.

Seldon Connor is buried in Augusta, Maine.

See also

List of American Civil War generals (Union)

References
 Maine State Archives Retrieved on 2008-04-20
. Google Books. Retrieved on 2007-11-30
 Governors information. Connor, Seldon. Retrieved on 2007-11-30.

Bibliography
 Connor, Seldon. An Address to Commemorate the One Hundredth Anniversary of the Birth of Hannibal Hamlin. Bangor, ME: The Press of The Thos. W Burr Printing Co, 1909.
 Herringshaw, Thomas William. 1909. "Connor, Seldon". Herringshaw's National Library of American Biography : Contains Thirty-Five Thousand Biographies of the Acknowledged Leaders of Life and Thought of the United States; Illustrated with Three Thousand Vignette Portraits.
 Johnson, Rossiter, et al. Campfire and Battlefield: An Illustrated History of the Campaigns and Conflicts of the Great Civil War. [Naples, Fl]: Trident Press International, 1999. Rossiter Johnson; J T Morgan; O O Howard; Seldon Connor; Henry W B Howard; John B Gordon; James Tanner; George L Kilmer; L C Pickett; Frank Beard; George Spiel; et al.

1839 births
1917 deaths
Republican Party governors of Maine
People from Fairfield, Maine
People of Maine in the American Civil War
Tufts University alumni
Union Army generals
19th-century American politicians